The Nara is a river in the Moscow Oblast and Kaluga Oblast in Russia. It is a left tributary of the Oka. The Nara freezes up in November–December and stays under the ice until April. The cities of Naro-Fominsk and Serpukhov are located on the Nara River.

Etymologically, the name Nara is of Baltic origin, a cognate of the Lithuanian nerti generally meaning "to dive, swim downstream" as well as "to net, crochet". This is because the area around its course was once inhabited by Eastern Galindians (Russian: Goliadj, голядь), a Baltic tribe.

References

Rivers of Kaluga Oblast
Rivers of Moscow Oblast